Atlanta Rowing Club (ARC) is a non-profit 501(c)(4) masters rowing club located in Roswell, Georgia. ARC's colors are red and white. As a masters organization, it is the only club in the Atlanta area for rowers who are beyond high school or college age, although there are several members who are in college. The club is a volunteer-based organization with 200+ members throughout the year. 

ARC conducts three four-week-long Learn-to-Row sessions each year. The classes teach people new to rowing how to row. ARC also hosts a National Learn-to-Row day where people can try rowing for one day at no cost. 

ARC has 3 buildings for storing boats; a large building mostly housing eights, fours and quads, a cage holding singles, doubles, and pairs, and a small building holding private singles. There is also an erg room, kitchen and bathroom in the main boathouse.

History

Founded in 1974, the club was initially located on the lake at Stone Mountain. By 1982 membership had grown and the club obtained the use of a small building and dock at the Chattahoochee River Park. By 1989 the main boathouse was constructed where it presently stands along Azalea Drive, across from the Chattahoochee River.

Notable members
 Jeffery Koplan - Former director of the Centers for Disease Control and Prevention (CDC), and currently vice president for academic health affairs Emory University in Atlanta, Georgia.
 Norton Schlachter - One of the first members and officers of the Atlanta Rowing Club in the early 70s. He was a USRowing board member and later Chairman of the US Men’s Olympic Committee. He was the first Southerner and youngest Chairman at the time.
 Daniel Wolff - French Junior National Champion in doubles sculls racing.
 John and Lyn Wylder - 1 of 3 couples in the world that are both International Rowing Federation (FISA) referees.

Board
The club's activities are managed by its board of directors and are governed by its By-laws. An election is held in January of each year to vote on the Board's five officers. Board meetings are held once a month to manage the club's business.

Boats

ARC owns 30 rowing shells that can be used by its members. In addition to club boats 70 private shells are stored in the boathouse including shells from Georgia State University crew team.

List of Current Equipment: 

Key - 1x = Single, 2- = Pair, 2x = Double, 2x/2- = Can be Rigged as either a Pair or Double, 4+ = Coxed Four, 4x = Quad, 4x/4- = Can be rigged as either a Coxless four or Quad, 8+ = Eight. For information about different types of boats see this article.

Regatta

ARC, in conjunction with Lookout Rowing Club hosts the Head of the Hooch Regatta in Chattanooga, Tennessee. The Head of the Hooch has been held in two other locations throughout its 27-year history. It is the third largest regatta in the United States. The largest is the Head of the Charles in Boston, Massachusetts.

References

External links
 
 Head of the Hooch website
 Flickr pool of ARC photos

Rowing clubs in the United States
Sports in Atlanta
Roswell, Georgia
Buildings and structures in Fulton County, Georgia
1974 establishments in Georgia (U.S. state)